HMCS Tuna was a commissioned torpedo boat of the Royal Canadian Navy (RCN) that served during the First World War. Built as the high-speed civilian yacht Tarantula, the vessel was one of several converted yachts the RCN used during the war. Following the war, the ship was discarded and stripped.

Design and description
Originally constructed as a civilian yacht, Tarantula was among the first turbine-powered private yachts. The hull was similar to the torpedo boats that Yarrow Shipbuilders had constructed for the Royal Navy. The ship had a maximum speed of  thanks to her turbine engines.

Construction and career
Built by Yarrow Shipbuilders in the United Kingdom, Tarantula was ordered by W.K. Vanderbilt, Jr. and launched in 1902. Vanderbilt used the yacht for commuting in and around New York City.

In August 1914, Jack Ross, a Canadian industrialist and millionaire, purchased Tarantula from Vanderbilt. At the time the United States had forbidden the sale of any vessel capable of being used by those nations fighting in World War I at the time. Ross arranged for her to be fitted out in the United States in secret and arrived at Halifax, Nova Scotia on 10 September after sailing with her civilian crew. Ross sold the ship for $1 to the RCN and offered to re-purchase the ship if the ship was still functional at war's end.

She was designated as a torpedo boat after the installation of two  torpedo tubes and a  gun. The ship was commissioned on 5 December 1914 as HMCS Tuna, with Ross in command. The ship was assigned to patrol duties based out of Halifax, she was a common sight in Bedford Basin.

In July 1916, Tuna underwent an overhaul at Sorel, Quebec. On 10 May 1917 Tuna was paid off due to an irreparable engine mount fracture. She was sold for salvage in June 1918, and stripped. Her hull remained in Halifax's Northwest Arm until the 1930s.

References

Citations

Sources

External links
 Converted civilian vessels
 Canadian Navy Heritage Project: Ship Technical Information
 Canadian Navy Heritage Project: Photo Archive 
 Kingsmill's Little Fleet
 The 1913 Cox & King Catalogue of Yachts and Motor Boats

Torpedo boats of the Royal Canadian Navy
1902 ships
World War I naval ships of Canada